The Yinggarda language (also written Yingkarta and Inggarda) is an Australian Aboriginal language. It is an endangered language, but efforts at language revival are being made.

Name
"Yinggarda" has been spelt in a number of ways, some linguists (including Dench) writing it as "Yingkarta".

Classification
It is one of the Kartu languages of the Pama–Nyungan family. The Ethnologue equates Yinggarda with Pulinya but it is unclear what the basis is for this connection as Wilfrid Douglas, who recorded the name 'Pulinya,' described it as a name for the old Geraldton language.

Unattested Maya (Maia) is reported to have been "like" Yinggarda and may have been a dialect.

Phonology

Consonants 

 /ɾ/ can be heard as a trill [r] when preceding consonants, and can also be heard as a glide [ɹ] when in intervocalic position.
 Stops /k, t̪, ʈ/ are heard as [ɣ, ð, ɽ] when in intervocalic position.

Vowels

Region
Yinggarda country is around Carnarvon, on the central western coast of Western Australia, and extends inland to near Gascoyne Junction and south to around the mouth of the Wooramel River.

Language revival
A dictionary of Yinggarda by Peter K. Austin was published in 1992. A sketch grammar was written by Alan Dench in 1998, who worked with some of the last speakers and carried out his research mainly in the 1970s and 1980s. The Yamaji Language Centre, now  the Irra Wangga Language Centre, has been continuing to work on the Yinggarda language since 1993.

, Yinggarda is one of 20 languages prioritised as part of the Priority Languages Support Project, being undertaken by First Languages Australia and funded by the Department of Communications and the Arts. The project aims to "identify and document critically-endangered languages — those languages for which little or no documentation exists, where no recordings have previously been made, but where there are living speakers".

References

Kartu languages
Endangered indigenous Australian languages in Western Australia